Dennis Elsas  is an American disc jockey in New York City, whose radio and voiceover career has spanned 50 years, most notably his more than 25 years at WNEW-FM in New York City, where he debuted on July 11, 1971. He also served as music director.  He currently hosts an afternoon show on WFUV in New York (90.7 FM) and weekend shows on Sirius XM Satellite Radio's Classic Vinyl and a live weekly call-in roundtable show, The Fab Fourum, on Sirius XM Satellite Radio's The Beatles Channel.

Career

Early broadcasting career
Raised in Jackson Heights, Queens, Elsas attended Queens College of the City University of New York, graduating in 1968.  During his time at Queens College, he was active as a disc jockey and program director and in 1966 helped establish WQMC, the campus radio station.

At the same time, the rock radio landscape was changing as FM radio was prohibited from duplicating the programming of their AM radio sister stations. Stations began seeking more alternative and original content and album-oriented rock emerged as a format that gave album rock a larger platform and the DJs more freedom and influence over what music listeners heard. In 1969, Elsas joined WVOX, a suburban FM radio station in New Rochelle, New York, where he broadcast a show called "Something Else Again" for the next two years.

WNEW-FM years and John Lennon interview
On July 11, 1971, Elsas launched what would become a 25-plus year career at WNEW-FM in New York City. During this time he was the station's music director in addition to hosting nighttime, mid-day and weekend shows. On-air interviews included Elton John, Pete Townshend, Paul McCartney, and John Lennon. While at WNEW-FM, he became an important voice in the progressive rock FM movement. Elsas left WNEW in 1998.

Elsas interviewed Lennon on September 28, 1974. The two-hour interview holds a special place among Beatles fans and scholars. Highlights from the interview have been featured in numerous Beatles documentaries and books, including in the permanent collection of the Museum of Television and Radio. Excerpts of the interview were used in the Beatles Anthology, the PBS film LennoNYC and Ron Howard's documentary The Beatles: Eight Days a Week - The Touring Years.

Considered by many to be the ultimate Lennon broadcast interview, Elsas got the story of the infamous Beatles "butcher cover."  Elsas recalled, "I was asking the right questions, about the album art. While we were off mic, I mentioned something about the Beatles, and he lights up. He turns around, and there's a huge wall of albums, I picked out an album and he said, 'Oh yeah, the one with the dead babies,' and begins telling me the story.... I said, 'John, do you mind telling me that on the air?' It was all live. We only had two turntables so I had to cue something up. It's that sort of on-the-fly-stuff. If they're comfortable, then you can ask the question."

WFUV and SiriusXM 
Since the summer of 2000, Elsas has hosted weekday afternoons (2-6PM) on New York’s WFUV (90.7 FM, and streaming at WFUV.org). He presents a wide variety of rock, folk, jazz and blues in the tradition of progressive radio he helped to create. He has interviewed numerous artists in studio including Elvis Costello, Ben Folds, Patti Smith, Edie Brickell and Ringo Starr.

In May 2004, Elsas joined SiriusXM’s Classic Vinyl (26). Focused on classic rock music, history and memories, his show airs Saturday and Sunday from 6pm-12am ET.

On May 18, 2017, SiriusXM launched The Beatles Channel and announced Elsas as host of the call-in show The Fab Fourum.

Rock 'n' Roll Never Forgets
In 2010 Elsas created Rock ‘N’ Roll Never Forgets, a live multi-media event that showcases his historic radio interviews with music legends such as Elton John, Jerry Garcia, Pete Townshend, and John Lennon along with his personal memories and behind-the-scenes stories, starting with the Top 40 radio that he grew up with, the progressive evolution of WNEW-FM, and his current work on WFUV and Sirius/XM.

References

External links
 Dennis Elsas' official website
 "Dennis Elsas shares rock 'n roll memories" (2012)
 
 Dennis Elsas John Lennon Interview
 Rock N' Roll Never Forgets

Radio personalities from New York City
Living people
1948 births
Queens College, City University of New York alumni
WFUV people